A village hall is a public building in a rural or suburban community which functions as a community centre without a religious affiliation.

United Kingdom

It is estimated that there are over 10,000 such village halls.

Such a hall is typically used for a variety of public and private functions, such as:

Parish council meetings
Polling station for local and national elections
Sports and exercise groups - badminton is typical
Local drama productions
Dances
Jumble sales
Private parties such as birthdays or wedding receptions

Village halls are generally run by committees, and if not already part of a local government body such as a parish council, then such committees are eligible for charitable status. They may have other names such as a Village Institute or Memorial Hall. In some localities a church hall or community centre provides similar functions.

Typically the hall will contain at least one large room, which may have a stage at one end for drama productions. There is often a kitchen for preparing food and toilets to one side. Larger halls may incorporate further smaller rooms to allow multiple simultaneous activities.

Wales

United States

In the United States, a village hall is the seat of government for villages. It functions much as a town hall or city hall.

See also 
 Church hall
 Community centre
 Function hall
 Local community
 Meeting house
 Moot hall
 Village Hall (TV series)

External links

Action for village halls in England

References 

Government buildings
 
Villages